The following discography is a catalogue of the albums and singles released by the Canadian entertainment company Cirque du Soleil.

The majority of these musical works are studio recordings of compositions from the original scores of Cirque du Soleil's nouveau cirque shows.  Since the company's founding in 1984, various composers have been commissioned to write the music for Cirque du Soleil's many productions.

René Dupéré was Cirque du Soleil's first composer. Benoît Jutras, who had worked for many years as an arranger and musical director for the company, began filling the role of composer with the show Quidam (1996 World Premiere in Montreal). In 1998, Violaine Corradi was also selected by Guy Laliberté and Gilles Ste-Croix to become the third main composer for Cirque du Soleil.

Dupéré, Jutras and Corradi would eventually be followed by composers Simon Carpentier, Philippe Leduc, Danny Elfman, Maria Bonzanigo, Jean-François Coté, Berna Ceppas, Guy Dubuc and Marc Lessard, among others.  The Cirque du Soleil shows Love, Viva Elvis, and Michael Jackson: The Immortal World Tour do not have original scores; instead, their soundtracks consist of new arrangements of songs by The Beatles, Elvis Presley, and Michael Jackson, respectively.

Albums

Cirque du Soleil
The 1987 and the subsequent 1990 Cirque du Soleil album contain music from the company's earliest touring productions:  Le Grand Tour, La Magie Continue and Le Cirque Réinventé (We Reinvent the Circus).

Cirque du Soleil (1987 album) 

Ouverture
 Personages
 Chaise Musicale / Musical Chair
 Bicycles
 Masha
 Les Pingouins / The Penguin Step
 Tango
 Trapeze
 Charivari

Cirque du Soleil (1990 album) 

 Ouverture
 Bulgares
 Boule 4
 Tango
 Trapeze
 Cadres
 Fil De Fer
 Bicyclettes
 Boules 1 à 3
 Les Chaises
 Entracte
 Pingouins

Nouvelle Expérience 

 Fanfare
 Méandres
 Boléro
 Bascule
 Fixe
 Ballant
 Baleines
 Havi Vahlia
 Suite Chinoise
 Éclipse
 L'Oiseau
 Azimut
 Sanza
 Grosse Femme

Saltimbanco

Saltimbanco (1992 album) 
 Kumbalawé
 Barock
 Kazé
 Amazonia
 Norweg
 Urgence
 Pokinoï
 Saltimbanco
 Il Sogno Di Volare
 Horéré Ukundé
 Rideau

Saltimbanco (extended album) 
Two additional tracks appeared on an "extended" edition of the CD, released March 19, 2002.  The tracks are identical to tracks 4 and 9 on the Live in Amsterdam limited edition (disc one).
   Adagio (Adagio)
  Arlequin (Juggling)

Saltimbanco (2005 re-release) 

 Kumbalawé
 Saltimbanco
 Cantus-Mélopée
 Norweg
 Kazé
 Barock
 Adagio
 Amazonia
 Pokinoï
 Il Sogno Di Volare
 Horéré Ukundé
 Rideau

Saltimbanco Live in Amsterdam 

This limited edition of the Saltimbanco soundtrack was distributed exclusively to staff members. It is a live recording of the show and is considered a collector's item.

Disc 1
  Cloche et Présentation
  Rideau
  Kumbalawé
  Adagio
  Saltimbanco
  Clown
  Kazé / Norweg
  Rêve
  Arlequin
  Rave Out

Disc 2
  Tap Dance
  Barock
  Cantus-Mélopée
  Amazonia
  Démontage Trapèze
  La Mort
  Urgence
  Il Sogno di Volare
  Transfert
  Horéré Ukundé

Alegría

Alegría 

 Alegría
 Vai Vedrai
 Kalandéro
 Querer
 Irna
 Taruka
 Jeux d'Enfants
 Mirko
 Icare
 Ibis
 Valsapena
 Nocturne

Alegría (extended album) 
A special "extended" edition of Alegría, released on June 11, 2002, additionally contains the following bonus tracks:
  Cerceaux (Manipulation)
 Malioumba (Flying Man)

Alegría Live at Fairfax 

This limited edition of the Alegría soundtrack was distributed exclusively to staff members. It is a live recording of the show and is considered a collector's item.

Disc 1
  Milonga
  Ouverture
  Mirko
  Prelude to Vai Vedrai
  Vai Vedrai
  Jeux d'Enfants 1
  Jeux d'Enfants 2
  Fast Track 1
  Fast Track 2
  Fast Track 3
  Fast Track 4
  Oiseaux sur la Corde
  La Perche 1
  La Perche 2
  Homme Fort
  Hoola Hoops
  La Tempête
  Le Feu

Disc 2
  Le Bal
  The Letter
  Prelude to Le Cube
  Le Cube
  Barres Russes
  Bardak 1
  Bardak 2
  Prelude to Contorsion
  Contorsion
  Montage du Filet
  Prelude to Grands Volants
  Grands Volants
 Alegría

Alegría: In a New Light 

With the announcement of a revamped re-imagining of Alegría show on April 25, 2018, Jean-Phi Goncalves was chosen to rework, remix, and compose newly arranged music for using the original music composed by René Dupéré. An official announcement for the release of Alegría: In a New Light soundtrack was announced by Cirque du Soleil on August 12, 2019. The album was released on August 16.

Mirko
Kalandéro
Querer
Cerceaux
Jeux d'enfants
Alegría
Ibis
Irna / Valsapena
Taruka
Vai vedrai
Malioumba
Valsajoïa
Alegría (Encore)

Mystère 
The first Mystère disc was launched as a studio album in 1994, but it only lasted two years until 1996, when composers René Dupéré and Benoit Jutras composed a new live version of the show, eliminating the studio album that is now considered a collector's item.

Mystère (studio album) 

 Égypte
 Rumeurs
 Birimbau
 Kunya Sobé
 En Ville
 Ulysse
 Rondo
 Caravena
 Kalimando

Mystère: Live in Las Vegas 

 Ouverture/Ramsani
 Misha
 Égypte
 Rondo/Double Face
 Ulysse
 Dôme
 Kalimando
 Kunya Sobé
 En Ville/Frisco
 Gambade
 High Bar
 Taïko
 Finale

Mystère Live 25 

This limited edition of the Mystère soundtrack was distributed exclusively to staff members for the conmemoration of Mystère 25 years in 2018. It is a live recording of the show and is considered a collector's item.

 Ouverture/Ramsani
 Misha
 Égypte
 Rondo/Double Face
 Ulysse
 Dôme
 Kalimando
 Kunya Sobé
 Convergence
 Rogue
 Fiesta
 Strike of the Net
 Finale

Quidam

Quidam (studio album) 

 Atmadja
 Incantation
 Marelle
 Rivage
 Zydeko
 Let Me Fall
 Innocence
 Carrousel
 Steel Dream
 Seisouso
 Réveil
 Quidam

Quidam (extended album) 
Two additional tracks were recorded live in Amsterdam.  Those two tracks appear only on the "extended" edition of the CD, released February 19, 2002:
   Misère (Banquine)
  Enfants d'Acier (Diabolos)

Collection 

This is a compilation of songs from previous Cirque du Soleil albums, including Nouvelle Expérience, Saltimbanco, Alegría and Mystère. 
 Ouverture
 Egypte
 Kumbalawe
 Suite Chinoise
 Querer
 Entracte
 Pokinoï
 Alegría
 Kalimando
 Grosse Femme

O 

 Jeux d'Eau
 Mer Noire
 Tzelma
 Africa
 Remous
 Svecounia
 Nostalgie
 Simcha
 Gamelan
 Ephra
 Désert
 Terre Aride
 O

Alegría: The Film Soundtrack 

 Alegría [new arrangement][version]
 Frac's Room/Frac and Train/Frac and Giulietta
 Love Leaves Someone Behind
 Opera/Fleur's Trailer
 Mirko/Vai Vedrai
 Love Leaves Someone Behind/Chase/Factory
 Herv
 Child in His Eyes
 Wedding
 Irna
 Herv/Giulietta and Fleur
 Filet/Make-Up/Let Love Live [instrumental]
 Mountain of Clothes
 Let Love Live [instrumental]
 Let Love Live

La Nouba 

 Once Upon A Time
 A Tale
 Porte
 La Nouba
 Distorted
 Liama
 Queens
 À La Lune
 Rêve Rouge
 Urban
 Propel
 Jardin Chinois

Dralion 

 Stella Errans
 Ombra
 Spiritual Spiral
 Miracula Aeternitatis
 Bamboo
 Ballare
 Ravendhi
 Ninkou Latora
 Aborigenes Jam
 Hinko
 Kamande

Journey of Man 

 Journey Of Man (vocals by Roxane Potvin)
 Overture
 Taiko
 Birth
 The Forest
 In The Beginning
 Youth
 Flying
 Réveil
 Banquine
 Journey Of Man (instrumental)
 Trip Hop

Varekai

Varekai (2003) 

 Rain One
 Le Rêveur
 Vocea
 Moon Licht
 Patzivota
 El Péndulo
 Gitans
 Kèro Hiréyo
 Lubia Dobarstan
 Emballa
 Oscillum
 Funambul
 Resolution

Varekai (2004 re-release) 

This re-release contains three tracks that were not present on the original edition as standalone songs. On the original edition, "Aureus" was the intro to "Rain One", "Rubeus" was the intro to "Patzivota", and "Infinitus" was the intro to "Lubia Dobarstan".
  Aureus
  Rain One
  Le Rêveur
  Vocea
  Moon Licht
  Rubeus
  Patzivota
  El Péndulo
  Gitans
  Kèro Hiréyo
  Infinitus
  Lubia Dobarstan
  Emballa
  Oscillum
  Funambul
  Resolution

Varekai: exclusive premium edition 
This special edition of Varekai comes with a bonus CD and a bonus DVD.  The main CD contains the 16-track version of the studio album.  The bonus CD contains six tracks recorded live in Toronto in 2002 and two remix tracks.  The bonus DVD contains music videos, a documentary excerpt and trailers.

Disc 1
 Aureus
 Rain One
 Le Rêveur
 Vocea
 Moon Licht
 Rubeus
 Patzivota
 El Péndulo
 Gitans
 Kèro Hiréyo
 Infinitus
 Lubia Dobarstan
 Emballa
 Oscillum
 Funambul
 Resolution

Bonus CD
Live tracks:
 Célébration de l'Errance (ouverture)
 Trasparenza (Acrobatic Pas de Deux)
 Euphoria (Icarian Games)
 Sun Drum Fun (Body Skating)
 Mutationis (Handbalancing on Canes)
 Movimento (Georgian Dance)
 El Péndulo - Fenomenon "Northern Comfort Mix"
 Emballa - Llorca remix

Bonus DVD
 Rubeus—Patzivota and Moon Licht (music videos)
 The Making of an Angel (documentary excerpt)
 Varekai the Show Ad
 Varekai DVD Ad
 Cirque du Soleil Music Ad

Zumanity 
The first Zumanity disc was launched as a promotional album in 2003, and was obtainable by purchasing the original 2003 show program. The songs on it are from the show's creation period. It is now considered a collector's item. The second album is the official album for the show; however, it is an inspired-by album based on the show's music. Most of the music is not featured in the show itself and never was.

Foreplay - EP 

 The Opener
 Major-Minor
 The Rose Boy
 My Erotic Lounge

Zumanity 

 Mio Bello Bello Amore
 Entrée
 En Zum
 Wind
 Another Man
 First Taste
 Do It Again
 Water Bowl
 The Good Thing
 Tickle Tango
 Into Me
 Fugare
 Meditation
 Piece of Heaven
 Zum Astra
 Mangora En Zum
 Per Sempre
 Bello Amore

Le Best Of 

This compilation features music from previous Cirque shows: Saltimbanco, Alegría, Mystère, Quidam, Dralion, Varekai, La Nouba and O.
 Égypte
 Alegría
 Pokinoi
 Querer
 Kumbalawé
 Ombra
 Réveil
 Nostalgie
 Vocea
 Stella Errans
 Gamelan
 Liama

Tapis Rouge: Solarium 

 Ombra – Lenny Ibizarre remix
 Alegría – A Man Called Adam's Magical remix
 A Tale – Chilluminati mix
 El Péndulo – Fenomenon "Northern Comfort Mix"
 Africa – Cottonbelly remix
 Nocturne – Christophe Goze remix
 Le Rêveur – Thievery Corporation remix
 Gamelan – Cantoma remix
 Ombra – After Life remix
 Africa – Banzai Republic "Equator Bound Mix"

Solarium/Delirium

Disc 1
 Ombra (Lenny Ibizarre remix)
 Alegría (A Man called Adam's Magical Mix)
 A Tale (Chilluminati mix)
 El Pendulo (Fenomenon "Northern Comfort Mix")
 Africa (Cottonbelly remix)
 Nocturne (Christophe Goze remix)
 Le Reveur (Thievery Corporation remix)
 Gamelan (Cantoma remix)
 Ombra (Afterlife mix)
 Africa (Banzai Republic "Equator Bound Mix")

Disc 2
 Emballa (Louie Vega featuring Jaffa "Album Mix")
 Querer (Julien Jabre remix)
 Kumbalawe (Roger Sanchez release mix)
 Aborigenes Jam (Frangois K / Eric Kupper "Vocal Mix")
 Pokinoi (Sasha remix)
 Africa (Quicksound / Alain Vinet remix)
 Terre Aride (Jori Hulkkonen remix)
 Spiritual Spiral (Carmen Rizzo remix)
 Mer Noire (Tiësto remix)

Kà 

 O Makundé
 Pageant
 Koudamare
 Storm
 Deep
 Shadowplay
 Pursuit
 Forest
 Flight
 Threat
 Love Dance
 Battlefield
 Aftermath
 If I Could Reach Your Heart
 We've Been Waiting So Long
 Reach For Me Now

Delirium 

 Cold Flame
 Slipping Away
 Someone
 Too High
 Walk on Water
 Alone
 Climb
 La Nova Alegría
 Lifeline
 Bridge of Sorrow
 One Love
 Let Me Fall
 Time to Go
 Time Flies
 Sans toi

Corteo 

 Funerale
 Ritornare
 Rêve d'un Pantin
 Les chevaux à bottes
 Nos Dejó
 Klezmer Moment
 Prendersi per mano
 Anneaux
 El cielo sabrá
 Fugue
 Volo Volando
 Un tierno y dulce
 Balade au bout d'une échelle
 Garda Lassù
 Triangle tango
 Che finalone

Love

Love (The Beatles album) 

 Because
 Get Back
 Glass Onion
 Eleanor Rigby/Julia (transition)
 I Am the Walrus
 I Want to Hold Your Hand
 Drive My Car/The Word/What You're Doing
 Gnik Nus
 Something/Blue Jay Way (transition)
 Being for the Benefit of Mr. Kite!/I Want You (She's So Heavy)/Helter Skelter
 Help!
 Blackbird/Yesterday
 Strawberry Fields Forever
 Within You Without You/Tomorrow Never Knows
 Lucy in the Sky with Diamonds
 Octopus's Garden
 Lady Madonna
 Here Comes the Sun/The Inner Light (transition)
 Come Together/Dear Prudence/Cry Baby Cry (transition)
 Revolution
 Back in the U.S.S.R.
 While My Guitar Gently Weeps
 A Day in the Life
 Hey Jude
 Sgt. Pepper's Lonely Hearts Club Band (reprise)
 All You Need Is Love

Digital bonus tracks
The Fool on the Hill
Girl

Love: Special Edition 

This Special Edition includes the regular Love CD and an Audio DVD that offers higher-quality sound in several formats including DVD-Audio MLP, DTS, Dolby and PCM.

Wintuk 

  Something's Missing
  Shadows
  Beyond the Clouds
  Dogs will be Dogs!
  He's Scared of His Shadow
  Norah Knows
  Heading North
  Back Where We Belong
  Northern Folk
  Elena
  Ice Giants
  Dolce Luce
  Tundra Ballet
  We Want to See it Snow
  Nothing's Missing
  Snowstorm

Koozå 

 Kooza Dance
 Superstar I
 L'Innocent
 Royaume
 Junoon
 Alambre Alto
 16- Papillon
 Pearl
 Cabaret Satã
 Aankh Micholi
 Diables
 El Péndulo de la Muerte
 Petit-Jaune
 Superstar II
 Imposteur
 Prarthana
 Don't Be Afraid
 Hum Jaisa Na Dekha

Zaia 

 Noi
 Aestus Calor
 Ignis
 Hatahkinn
 Aquilex
 Comissatio
 Blue Ales
 Adrideo
 Ardor Oris
 Aequor Oris
 Caelestis
 Undae
 Temperatio
 Ellâm Onru
 Gaudiumni
 Utinam

25 

This compilation is a 25th-anniversary collection of music from 25 different Cirque du Soleil shows.

CD #1 "Poetique"
 Ouverture (Cirque Réinventé)
 Le Funambule (Cirque du Soleil and La Magie Continue)
 Méandres (Nouvelle Expérience and Fascination)
 Havi Vahlia (Nouvelle Expérience)
 Vai Vedrai (Alegría)
 A Tale (La Nouba)
 Piece of Heaven (Zumanity)
 Volo Volando (Corteo)
 Beyond the Clouds (Wintuk)
 Sexy Pet (Criss Angel Believe)
 The Worlds Meet (Zed)
 Banquete (Ovo)
 Alegría (Alegría, le film)

CD #2 "Dynamique"
 Le Cirque du Soleil (Cirque du Soleil)
 Les Pingouins (Cirque du Soleil and Cirque Reinventé)
 Barock (Saltimbanco)
 Rivage (Quidam)
 Birimbau (Mystère)
 Svecounia (O)
 Ravendhi (Dralion)
 Lubia Dobarstan (Varekai)
 Pursuit (Kà)
 One Love (Delirium)
 Hum Jaisa Na Dekha (Koozå)
 Utinam (Zaia)

Zed 

 First Incantation
 Birth of the Sky
 Reaching Up
 Blue Silk
 High Temptation
 Vaneyou Mile
 Zed in Love
 Kernoon's Fire
 Mirror of the Two Worlds
 The Worlds Meet
 Fiesta
 Hymn of the Worlds

Ovo 

 Brisa Do Mar
 Foreigner
 Ants
 Cocoon
 Frevo Zumbido
 Orvalho
 Carimbó Da Creatura
 Love Duet
 Scarabées
 Sexy Web
 Legs
 Flea Girls
 Super Hero
 Secret Samba Luv
 Parede
 Banquete

Totem 

 Omé Kayo
 Cum Sancto Spiritu
 Indie-Hip
 Koumaya
 Crystal Pyramid
 Thunder
 Toreador
 Qué Viyéra
 Mr. Beaker
 Onta
 Kunda Tayé
 Fast Boat
 Terre-Mère
 Ome Yo Kanoubé

Viva Elvis

Viva Elvis (studio album) 

 Opening
 Blue Suede Shoes
 That's All Right
 Heartbreak Hotel
 Love Me Tender
King Creole
 Bossa Nova Baby
 Burning Love
 Memories
 Can't Help Falling In Love
 You'll Never Walk Alone (piano interlude)
 Suspicious Minds

Viva Elvis (bonus album) 
In each country, a bonus version of "Love Me Tender" was included, featuring a local singer in place of the singer from the Cirque du Soleil show.
  Love Me Tender (featuring Thalía in the US and Latin America)

Criss Angel Believe 

 Homage to the Rabbits
 The Life Factory
 Sexy Pet
 Flying with the Birds
 Kayala and the Poppies
 Sympathy for Crimson
 The Magic Door
 The Cockroach Dance
 In and Out of the Dream
 Shadows and Whispers
 Being Houdini I
 Being Houdini II
 Prewed
 Blow Me a Tornado
 She is Gone to the Sky
 The Magic Wedding

Michael Jackson: Immortal

Standard edition 
 "Workin' Day And Night" (Immortal version)
 "The Immortal Intro" (Immortal version)
 "Childhood" (Immortal version)
 "Wanna Be Startin' Somethin'" (Immortal version)
 "Dancing Machine/Blame It On The Boogie" (Immortal version)
 "This Place Hotel" (Immortal version)
 "Smooth Criminal" (Immortal version)
 "Dangerous (Immortal version)
 The Jackson 5 Medley: "I Want You Back"/"ABC"/"The Love You Save" (Immortal version)
 "Speechless"/"Human Nature" (Immortal version)
 "Is It Scary"/"Threatened" (Immortal version)
 "Thriller" (Immortal version)
 "You Are Not Alone"/"I Just Can't Stop Loving You" (Immortal version)
 "Beat It"/"State of Shock" (Immortal version)
 "Jam" (Immortal version)
 "Planet Earth/Earth Song" (Immortal version)
 "They Don't Care About Us" (Immortal version)
 "I'll Be There" (Immortal version)
 "Immortal Megamix: Can You Feel It/Don't Stop 'Til You Get Enough/Billie Jean/Black or White" (Immortal version)
 "Man in the Mirror" (Immortal version)

Deluxe edition 
Disc 1
 "Working Day and Night" (Immortal version)
 "The Immortal Intro" (Immortal version)
 "Childhood" (Immortal version)
 "Wanna Be Startin' Somethin'" (Immortal version)
 "Shake Your Body (Down to the Ground)" (Immortal version)
 "Dancing Machine/Blame It on the Boogie" (Immortal version)
 "Ben" (Immortal version)
 "This Place Hotel" (Immortal version)
 "Smooth Criminal" (Immortal version)
 "Dangerous" (Immortal version)
 The Mime Segment: "(I Like) The Way You Love Me"/"Speed Demon"/"Another Part of Me" (Immortal version)
 J5 Medley: "I Want You Back"/"ABC"/"The Love You Save" (Immortal version)
 "Speechless/Human Nature" (Immortal version)
 "Is It Scary/Threatened" (Immortal version)
 "Thriller" (Immortal version)

Disc 2
 "You Are Not Alone"/"I Just Can't Stop Loving You" (Immortal version)
 "Beat It"/"State of Shock" (Immortal version)
 "Jam" (Immortal version)
 "Planet Earth"/"Earth Song" (Immortal version)
 "Scream"/"Little Susie" (Immortal version)
 "Gone Too Soon" (Immortal version)
 "They Don't Care About Us" (Immortal version)
 "Will You Be There" (Immortal version)
 "I'll Be There" (Immortal version)
 Immortal Megamix: "Can You Feel It"/"Don't Stop 'til You Get Enough"/"Billie Jean"/"Black or White" (Immortal version)
 "Man in the Mirror" (Immortal version)
 "Remember the Time"/"Bad" (Immortal version)

Iris 

 Buster's Big Opening
 The Twins
 Kiriki Film
 Kiriki
 Silent Movie
 Patterns
 Clown Special Effects
 Pellicule (Part I & II)
 Snake Women
 Movie Studio
 The Broom
 Flying Scarlett
 Old Toys
 Film Noir/Pursuit
 Rooftops
 Scarlett Balancing
 Iris Finale and Bows

Le Best Of 2 

This compilation features music from previous Cirque shows: Amaluna, Kooza, Zed, Corteo, Believe, Zaia, Ovo, Ka, Wintuk, Zumanity and Totem. 
Magic Ceremony I
Pearl
Blue Silk
Anneaux
Flying Scarlett
Qué Viyéra
Flying with the Birds
Noi
Secret Samba Luv
Pageant
Beyond the Clouds
Piece of Heaven
Omé Yo Kanoubé

Amaluna 

All Come Together 
Elma Om Mi Lize
Tempest
Enchanted Reunion
Fly Around
Hope
O Ma Ley
Burn Me Up
Whisper
Running On the Edge
Ena Fee Alyne
Creature of Light
Mutation
Run

Zarkana 

Antlia 
Zawraq
Eridanus
Caph
Crysococca
Kuma
Tarientar / The Archer
Gienah
Rae
Tourago / Guiram
Jarseate
Asteraw

Kurios: Cabinets Des Curiosités 

11h11
Steampunk Telegram
Bella Donna Twist
Gravity Levitas
Monde Inversé
Hypnotique
Departure
Fearsome Flight
Clouds
Créature De Siam
Wat U No Wen
You Must Be Joking

JOYÀ 

Naturalium 
Comedy of Errors
Reinas En La Penumbra
Adventure at Sea
The Dive
Profunda Belleza
Legacy
Nueva Era

Toruk – The First Flight 

Omaticaya Clan
Lu Aw Navi
Shaman Story
Tawkami Clan
The Anurai Clan Sanctuary
Viperwolves and the Tipani Clan
Direhorses
Kekunan Clan
Hallelujah Mountains
The Toruk
Luminous Reunion

Luzia 

Asi Es La Vida
Tiembla La Tierra
Flores En El Desierto
Pambolero
Pez Volador
Los Mosquitos
Alebrijes
Tlaloc
Cierra Los Ojos
Fiesta Finale

Paramour 
	
The Hollywood Wiz
Ginger Top
Something More
AJ's Blues
The Muse
Serenade from a Window
The Honeymoon Days of Fame
Cleopatra
Egyptian Gift
Help a Girl Choose
The Dream
Revenge Fantasies
Love Triangle
Writer's Block
Everything (The Lover's Theme)
NYC Rooftops
Reel Love
Everything (Reprise)

Sep7imo Dia (No Descansaré) (Soda Stereo album) 

 En El Septimo Dia
 Cae El Sol / Planta
 Picnic en el 4ºB / Te Hacen Falta Vitaminas / Mi Novia Tiene Biceps
 Ella Uso / Un Misil
 Profugos
 En Remolinos
 Planeador
 Persiana Americana
 Signos
 Un Millon De Años Luz
 Intro Luna Roja
 Luna Roja
 Crema de Estrellas
 Cuando Pase el Temblor
 Hombre Al Agua
 Sueles Dejarme Solo
 En La Ciudad de La Furia
 Efecto Doppler
 Primavera 0
 De Musica Ligera
 Terapia de Amor Intensiva

VOLTA 

To the Stars
Dancing Ants
The Bee and the Wind
Man Craft
Modern Jungle
Inside Me
The Change
Suspension
Elevation
Lone Soul
Battle of the Man
Like Kids

Stone: Hommage à Plamondon

Remixes

Tapis Rouge vinyl mixes 
Limited editions of previously released remixes in vinyl format (vinyl 12-inch, White Label, 33⅓ RPM) have been released by Cirque du Soleil Musique and sold in Canada and the United States.

Vol. 1: Africa 

Track list:

Vol. 2: Ombra 

Track list:

Vol. 3: Aborigenes Jam 

Track list:

Vol. 4: Emballa 

Track list:

Vol. 5: Kumbalawe 

 Track list:

Vol. 6: Mer Noire 

Track list:

Vol. 7: Tapis Rouge Remixed 

Track list:

References

External links 
 

Discography
Discographies of Canadian artists
Theatre soundtracks